Choo Chang-min (born 1966) is a South Korean film director and screenwriter. His 2012 period film Masquerade became one of the top-grossing Korean films of all time.

Career
Choo Chang-min began his career as an assistant director on such films as City of the Rising Sun (1999) and The Happy Funeral Director (2000). His first short film, The End of April (2000), was highly acclaimed at several international film festivals. Choo made his feature film debut with hit comedy Mapado: Island of Fortunes (2005).

Choo then directed the Sol Kyung-gu-Song Yun-ah melodrama Lost in Love (2006), followed by the senior citizen romance Late Blossom (2011) which became a sleeper hit through word of mouth after it was released. His period film Masquerade (2012) was a huge critical and commercial success, for which Choo won Best Director at the prestigious Grand Bell Awards and the Baeksang Arts Awards.

Filmography
Seven Years of Night (2018) - director, screenwriter
Masquerade (2012) - director
Late Blossom (2011) - director, screenplay, editor
Lost in Love (2006) - director, screenplay
Mapado (2005) - director
The End of April (short film, 2000) - director, screenplay, producer
The Happy Funeral Director (2000) - assistant director
City of the Rising Sun (1999) - assistant director

References

External links
 
 
 

South Korean film editors
South Korean film directors
South Korean screenwriters
1966 births
Living people
Best Director Paeksang Arts Award (film) winners